Burnet County is a county located on the Edwards Plateau in the U.S. state of Texas. As of the 2020 census, its population was 49,130.  Its county seat is Burnet. The county was founded in 1852 and later organized in 1854. It is named for David Gouverneur Burnet, the first (provisional) president of the Republic of Texas. The name of the county is pronounced with the emphasis or accent on the first syllable, just as is the case with its namesake.

History
Indigenous peoples inhabited the area as early as 4500 BC. Later known tribes in the area include Tonkawa, Lipan Apache, and Comanche.

During the 1820s-1830s, Stephen F. Austin and Green DeWitt conducted surveying and Indian-fighting explorations. In 1849, the United States established Fort Croghan, and in 1848, the first settlers arrived in the county, Samuel Eli Holland, Logan Vandeveer, Peter Kerr, William Harrison Magill, Noah Smithwick, Captain Jesse B. Burnham, R. H. Hall, Adam Rankin "Stovepipe" Johnson, and Captain Christian Dorbandt. In 1851, 20 Mormon families under the leadership of Lyman Wight establish a colony at Hamilton Creek,  later to be known as Morman Mill.

In 1852, the Fourth Texas Legislature created Burnet County from Bell, Travis, and Williamson Counties. The first post office was established at Hamilton in 1853.

In 1860, 235 slaves were in Burnet County. After the war, some former slaves left the county, but many stayed. A group of them settled on land in the eastern part of Oatmeal. In 1870, the black population of the county had increased to 358, keeping pace with the growth of the total number of residents; the number of blacks had fallen to 248 by 1880, however, and the number of new white residents was such that after 1890, blacks represented less than 3% of the total population. Some found work on farms and ranches, but by the turn of the century, many had moved into the Marble Falls area to work in town.

During 1882–1903, railroad tracks connected Burnet, Granite Mountain, Marble Falls, and Lampasas. Lake Victor and Bertram became shipping-point communities. Other communities lost population as the railroad offered employment. During the Great Depression, county farmers suffered financially, but found work with government-sponsored public-works projects. The Lower Colorado River Authority employed hundreds of people for the construction of the Hamilton (Buchanan) Dam and Roy B. Inks Dam.

Geography

Major highways
  U.S. Highway 183
  U.S. Highway 281
  State Highway 29

Adjacent counties
 Lampasas County (north)
 Bell County (northeast)
 Williamson County (east)
 Travis County (southeast)
 Blanco County (south)
 Llano County (west)
 San Saba County (northwest)

National protected area
 Balcones Canyonlands National Wildlife Refuge (part)

Demographics

Note: the US Census treats Hispanic/Latino as an ethnic category. This table excludes Latinos from the racial categories and assigns them to a separate category. Hispanics/Latinos can be of any race.

As of the census of 2020, 49,130 people and 16,743 households resided in the county.  (The remaining data that follow in this section are outdated.  The Census 2020 data for the following demographics have not yet been released.)  The population density was 34 people/sq mi (13/km2).  The 15,933 housing units averaged 16/sq mi (6/km2).  The racial makeup of the county was 89.64% White, 1.52% African American, 0.68% Native American, 0.28% Asian,  6.30% from other races, and 1.58% from two or more races. About 14.77% of the population were Hispanic or Latino of any race.

Of the 16,743 households, 30.10% had children under the age of 18 living with them, 61.50% were married couples living together, 8.60% had a female householder with no husband present, and 26.40% were not families. About 22.50% of all households were made up of individuals, and 10.80% had someone living alone who was 65 years of age or older.  The average household size was 2.53, and the average family size was 2.94.

In the county, the age distribution was 24.50% under  18, 7.00% from 18 to 24, 26.00% from 25 to 44, 24.50% from 45 to 64, and 17.90% who were 65  or older.  The median age was 40 years. For every 100 females, there were 93.80 males.  For every 100 females age 18 and over, there were 91.30 males.

Males had a median income of $30,255 versus $20,908 for females. The per capita income for the county was $18,850. About 7.90% of families and 10.90% of the population were below the poverty line, including 14.50% of those under age 18 and 7.90% of those age 65 or over.

Communities

Cities

 Bertram
 Burnet (county seat)
 Cottonwood Shores
 Double Horn
 Granite Shoals
 Highland Haven
 Horseshoe Bay (mostly in Llano County)
 Marble Falls
 Meadowlakes

Unincorporated communities

 Fairland
 Joppa
 Lake Victor
 Mahomet
 Naruna
 Oakalla
 Oatmeal
 Sherwood Shores
 Shovel Mountain
 Silver Creek Village
 Smithwick
 Spicewood
 Watson

Notable people
 Adam R. "Stovepipe" Johnson, Confederate general and the 1887 founder of Marble Falls, despite being blinded during the war.
 Gerald Lyda (1923–2005), general contractor and cattle rancher, born and raised in Burnet County.
 Stephen McGee (born September 27, 1985), former American football quarterback. Played college football for Texas A&M. Drafted and played NFL football for the Dallas Cowboys.
 James Oakley, former County Commissioner (1998–2005) and County Judge (2015–Present)
 Logan Vandeveer, early Texas soldier, ranger, cattleman and civic leader. Vandeveer was a leader in presenting the petition to the legislature in 1852 to establish Burnet County and was instrumental in having the town of Burnet named the county seat.
 Al Witcher (born 1936), American football player

Politics

See also

 List of museums in Central Texas
 National Register of Historic Places listings in Burnet County, Texas
 Recorded Texas Historic Landmarks in Burnet County

References

External links

 Burnet County government’s website
 Burnet County tourism office
 
 Burnet County TXGenWeb Project
 Burnet Bulletin newspaper
 The Highlander newspaper

 
1854 establishments in Texas
Populated places established in 1854
Texas Hill Country